Giada Borgato (born 15 June 1989) is an Italian professional racing cyclist. She has rode for three UCI Women's Teams; Diadora–Pasta Zara in 2012, Pasta Zara–Cogeas in 2013 and Estado de México–Faren Kuota in 2014.

References

External links
 

1989 births
Living people
Italian female cyclists
Place of birth missing (living people)
Sportspeople from Padua
Cyclists from the Province of Padua